Eater of Birds is the second album by the Black Metal band Cobalt. It was released by Profound Lore in 2007.  It presents a more progressive and experimental songwriting approach than the band's debut.

Track listing

Credits
Erik Wunder - Vocals, Guitar, Bass, Drums
Phil McSorley - Vocals

External links
Eater of Birds at Metal-archives.com

2007 albums
Cobalt (band) albums